David Stewart Rhoads (May 27, 1932 – February 21, 2017) was an American cyclist. He competed at the 1952 and 1956 Summer Olympics.

References

External links
 

1932 births
2017 deaths
American male cyclists
Olympic cyclists of the United States
Cyclists at the 1952 Summer Olympics
Cyclists at the 1956 Summer Olympics
Sportspeople from Long Beach, California
American track cyclists